The 2021 Lamar Hunt U.S. Open Cup tournament proper was to feature teams from all five tiers of the men's American soccer pyramid.

Qualification for the 2021 tournament was drastically altered due to the ongoing COVID-19 pandemic. The tournament itself was downsized to 16 teams, before ultimately being canceled for the second consecutive season due to the pandemic.

Major League Soccer 

The top eight American-based teams based in the regular season standings after three weeks of the season, taken on a points-per-game (PPG) basis, were set to qualify for the tournament before its cancellation. Qualification began on April 16, 2021, and concluded on May 2, 2021.

USL Championship 

The four semifinalists from the USL Championship playoffs qualified. Qualification retroactively began on October 10, 2020, and ended on October 17, 2020.

Groups A and B 

Phoenix Rising qualify

Groups C and D 

El Paso Locomotive qualify

Groups E and F 

Louisville City qualify

Groups G and H 

Tampa Bay Rowdies qualify

Table 
</onlyinclude>

Division III

NISA 

The NISA Fall Champion, Detroit City FC, retroactively qualified on October 2, 2020.

Bracket

Matches

Semifinals

Final

USL League One 

The 2020 USL League One champion, Greenville Triumph SC qualified.

Final 
The game was canceled the day before because several Union Omaha players tested positive for COVID-19. Greenville was awarded the title based on points per game average (2.188 to 1.825), and reached the Open Cup.

Open Division (IV and V) 
Two slots will be selected from the Open Divisions:
 One Open Division Local Qualifier drawn randomly from among 12 eligible
 One National Premier Soccer League team drawn randomly from among 13 eligible
 One USL League Two team drawn randomly from among 10 eligible
 2019 U.S. Adult Soccer Association National Amateur Cup champion Newtown Pride FC (Conn.)

The draw awarded the slots to Newtown Pride FC (NAC) and FC Golden State Force (USL2).

References

External links
 U.S. Soccer Federation

Qualification
2021 in American soccer
U.S. Open Cup qualification, 2021